Broadway is a town in Lee County, North Carolina, United States. According to the 2010 Census, the population was 1,229.

History
According to the book, Broadway North Carolina: 1870-1970, Broadway was settled in 1870 and incorporated as a town in 1907. The name "Broadway" comes from a broad level opening in the region's vast pine forest where the town was established. Among the early settlers of the area which is now Broadway were Hugh Matthews, Grisham Thomas, Tilmon Thomas, M.M. Watson, and Captain J.O.A. Kelly. African American families that settled in the area included the Buchanans, Camerons, McLeans, Minters, and Womacks.

Broadway celebrated the centennial of its settlement in October 1970. During this event men and women had a street dance and dressed as they did in the 1870s. Broadway celebrated the centennial of its incorporation as well as the centennial of Lee County in 2007. Broadway recently celebrated "Broadway Our Way" in April 2009. A few years into the 21st century, many citizens of Broadway town proper paid a visit to New York to see a Broadway show, and in return Broadway, New York, came to Broadway, North Carolina. A show was put on at Broadway Elementary School with Sandy Duncan, actress of television and stage leading the way.

Government
The town of Broadway has a mayor and council form of government. Past mayors of the town include M.A. McLeod, A.P. Thomas, Vernon Stevens, Sion Hubert Rosser, Leonard Rosser, H.A. Thomas, Thelma Sloan, Ralph Hunter, Henry Green, Harold Harrington. The current mayor is Donald Andrews.

Finance
The Bank of Broadway was started by D.E. Shaw in 1909. During the Great Depression the Bank of Broadway kept operations running, and it was noted in the Sanford Herald on January 23, 1930: "Bank of Broadway is an unusual institution. In the midst of financial depression, it is in a flourishing condition." It is widely believed and recorded somewhere in the annals of the SEC and FDIC history that on the March 6, 1933 Bank Holiday, the Bank of Broadway did not close its doors, the examiners stated that the books were in proper order and the accounts were solvent, keep operating. The Bank of Broadway has changed hands over the years, becoming first the Central Bank and Trust Company, then the Carolina Bank, the branch was closed in 2018.

Geography
Broadway is located in eastern Lee County at  (35.458280, -79.053206). U.S. Route 421 passes south of the town limits, leading west to Sanford and east  to Lillington.

Demographics

2020 census

As of the 2020 United States census, there were 1,267 people, 544 households, and 384 families residing in the town.

2000 census
As of the census of 2000, there were 1,015 people, 400 households, and 318 families residing in the town. The population density was 812.2 people per square mile (313.5/km2). There were 419 housing units at an average density of 335.3 per square mile (129.4/km2). The racial makeup of the town was 90.54% White, 8.47% African American, 0.49% Native American, and 0.49% from two or more races. Hispanic or Latino of any race were 1.48% of the population.

There were 400 households, out of which 31.5% had children under the age of 18 living with them, 65.5% were married couples living together, 8.0% had a female householder with no husband present, and 20.5% were non-families. 17.0% of all households were made up of individuals, and 8.8% had someone living alone who was 65 years of age or older. The average household size was 2.54 and the average family size was 2.83.

In the town, the population was spread out, with 23.0% under the age of 18, 5.9% from 18 to 24, 28.7% from 25 to 44, 29.1% from 45 to 64, and 13.4% who were 65 years of age or older. The median age was 40 years. For every 100 females, there were 97.5 males. For every 100 females age 18 and over, there were 89.3 males.

The median income for a household in the town was $52,917, and the median income for a family was $57,500. Males had a median income of $36,357 versus $24,667 for females. The per capita income for the town was $24,397. About 4.1% of families and 6.4% of the population were below the poverty line, including 11.0% of those under age 18 and 12.9% of those age 65 or over.

Business

There are several businesses in Broadway. There is one open bank in Broadway: First Bank. Branch Banking and Trust closed the Broadway Branch on May 18, 2018.  There is a doctor's office in Sandhills Family Practice.  There is a dentist office in Dr. Greg Manning, Dr. Eldon Sloan and Son.  There are several hair salons and a barber shop. One of the two stores is a Piggly Wiggly.  Broadway's latest business is the Walmart Express which opened on August 21, 2013, which closed down in early 2016. Dollar General moved into the building that previously housed Walmart Express. There is a body shop and two auto repair businesses: Danny's and Jones'.  There is hardware store in Broadway Hardware, owned by Frank McDonald.  Broadway has its own fire department in Cape Fear Fire Department.  Broadway has an eye clinic and an insurance business.  Broadway would not be complete without two Pizza's places:  Broadway Subs and Pizza and Hunt Brothers Pizza. Broadway also has over half a dozen churches of all denominations.

References

External links
 Town of Broadway official website

Towns in North Carolina
Towns in Harnett County, North Carolina
Towns in Lee County, North Carolina
Populated places established in 1870
1870 establishments in North Carolina